Vladislav Arena is an arena in Varna, Bulgaria.

The arena holds 600 people, and it is primarily used for handball and futsal. The arena is home to  handball team Lokomotiv Metalex Bild and futsal teams MFC Varna, FC Odesos and FC MAG.

Handball venues in Bulgaria
Sports venues in Varna, Bulgaria
Indoor arenas in Bulgaria